Éric Berdoati (born 9 May 1964) is a French politician who has been serving the mayor of Saint-Cloud since 2005.

Political career
Berdoati served as a member of the National Assembly from 2010 to 2012, where he represented Hauts-de-Seine's 7th constituency. At the 2017 election he was the candidate for the Republicans in Hauts-de-Seine's 7th constituency, losing to LREM's Jacques Marilossian.

Political positions
In 2019, Berdoati publicly declared his support for incumbent President Emmanuel Macron.

References

1964 births
Living people
People from Vincennes
Mayors of places in Île-de-France
Deputies of the 13th National Assembly of the French Fifth Republic
The Republicans (France) politicians
French people of Italian descent